Mokhalasun (also Romanized as Mokhalleşūn, Mokhlesoon, and Mokhleşūn; also known as  Mokhannetūn, Mokhannetūn, Mokhannetūn, and Mukhalisun) is a village in Khvormiz Rural District, in the Central District of Mehriz County, Yazd Province, Iran. At the 2006 census, its population was 23, in 10 families.

References 

Populated places in Mehriz County